Syrbula admirabilis, known generally as admirable grasshopper, is a species of slant-faced grasshopper in the family Acrididae. Other common names include the handsome grasshopper and handsome locust. It is found in Central America and North America.

References

Further reading

External links

 

Acrididae
Articles created by Qbugbot
Insects described in 1864